Jodok Salzmann (born 27 March 1995) is an Austrian racing cyclist, who currently rides for UCI Continental team .

Major results
2017
 3rd Overall Grand Prix Cycliste de Gemenc
2018
 1st Stage 2b (ITT) Tour of Bihor
 5th V4 Special Series Debrecen - Ibrany
 8th Kerekparverseny
2019
 4th Overall Oberösterreich Rundfahrt

References

External links
 

1995 births
Living people
Austrian male cyclists
Place of birth missing (living people)